The eighth series of the BBC espionage television series Spooks began broadcasting on 4 November 2009 before ending on 23 December 2009. The series consists of eight episodes.

Cast
Main
 Hermione Norris as Ros Myers
 Richard Armitage as Lucas North
 Miranda Raison as Jo Portman (episodes 1–3)
 Shazad Latif as Tariq Masood
 Hugh Simon as Malcolm Wynn-Jones (episode 1)
with Nicola Walker as Ruth Evershed
and Peter Firth as Harry Pearce

Guests
 Genevieve O'Reilly as Sarah Caulfield
 Robert Glenister as Nicholas Blake
 Brian Protheroe as Samuel Walker
 Tobias Menzies as Andrew Lawrence
 Peter Sullivan as Viktor Sarkisian

Episodes

Notes

References

External links
 

2009 British television seasons
Spooks (TV series)